Jewish anarchism encompasses various expressions of anarchism within the Jewish community.

Secular Jewish anarchism 

Many people of Jewish origin, such as Emma Goldman, Alexander Berkman, Paul Goodman, Murray Bookchin, Volin, Gustav Landauer, David Graeber, and Noam Chomsky have played a role in the history of anarchism. However, as well as these anarchists of Jewish origin, there have also been specifically Jewish anarchist movements, within the Yiddish-speaking communities of Eastern and Central Europe, and the Western cities to which they migrated, from the late nineteenth century until the Second World War.  All the members of the first anarchist group in the Russian Empire, which was formed in 1903 in Białystok, were Jews. Yiddish-speaking Jews participated in the International Anarchist Congress of Amsterdam in 1907.

Jewish anarchist movements tended to stress the internationalist character of the movement, but many of them also supported their national culture and focused on specifically Jewish issues. Yiddish anarchist literature flourished since the 1880s until the 1950s and, on much smaller scale, until the 1980s; the last Yiddish periodical publication, Problemen was published in 1991. In addition to many original books, pamphlets, poems and essays, all the major works of Pierre-Joseph Proudhon, Mikhail Bakunin, Peter Kropotkin, Errico Malatesta, Henry Thoreau, Leo Tolstoy, Max Stirner and other anarchists were translated into Yiddish. Rudolf Rocker, a non-Jewish German anarchist, had studied Yiddish and authored many Yiddish books, pamphlets and articles. Most Jewish anarchists were anarcho-syndicalists, while a few others were individualist anarchists.

Different anarchist groups had different views on Zionism and the Jewish question. Bernard Lazare was a key figure in both the French anarchist movement and early Zionist movement. The later Territorialist movement, especially the Freeland League, under the leadership of Isaac Nachman Steinberg, was very close to anarchism. Some others, such as Martin Buber and Gershom Scholem, advocated non-nationalist forms of Zionism, and promoted the idea of creating a binational Jewish-Arab federation in Palestine. Many contemporary anarchists support the idea of what has been dubbed the "no-state solution". Noam Chomsky has said that, as an anarchist, he ultimately favors such a no-state solution, but, in the short term, feels a two-state solution is the best way out of the present conflict.

Religious Jewish anarchism 

Jacques Ellul recounts that at the end of the Book of Judges (Judges 21:25) there was no king in Israel and everyone did as they saw fit. Later in the first Book of Samuel (1 Samuel 8) the people of Israel wanted a king to be like other nations. God declared that the people had rejected him as their king. He warned that a human king would lead to militarism, conscription, and taxation and that their pleas for mercy from the king's demands would go unanswered. Samuel passed on God's warning to the Israelites but they disregarded him and chose Saul as their king. Much of the subsequent Tanakh chronicles them trying to live with this decision.

While many Jewish anarchists were irreligious or sometimes vehemently anti-religious, there were also a few religious anarchists and pro-anarchist thinkers, who combined contemporary radical ideas with traditional Judaism. Some secular anti-authoritarians, such as Abba Gordin and Erich Fromm, also noticed remarkable similarity between anarchism and many Kabbalistic ideas, especially in their Hasidic interpretation. Some Jewish mystical groups were based on anti-authoritarian principles, somewhat similar to the Christian Quakers and Dukhobors. Martin Buber, a deeply religious philosopher, had frequently referred to the Hasidic tradition.

The Orthodox Kabbalist rabbi Yehuda Ashlag believed in a religious version of libertarian communism, based on principles of Kabbalah, which he called altruist communism. Ashlag supported the Kibbutz movement and preached to establish a network of self-ruled internationalist communes, who would eventually "annul the brute-force regime completely, for 'every man did that which was right in his own eyes, because "there is nothing more humiliating and degrading for a person than being under the brute-force government".

A British Orthodox rabbi, Yankev-Meyer Zalkind, was an anarcho-communist and very active anti-militarist. Rabbi Zalkind, a close friend of Rudolf Rocker, was a prolific Yiddish writer and a prominent Torah scholar. He argued, that the ethics of the Talmud, if properly understood, is closely related to anarchism.

Contemporary Jewish anarchism 

Over the past decade, there has been a renewed interest in Jewish anarchism due to the growth of organizations like Jewdas and Pink Peacock (UK) and media outlets like the Treyf podcast (Canada). This interest has been aided by the publication of new books on the subject, such as Kenyon Zimmer's Immigrants against the State, and the reissuing of documentaries such as The Free Voice of Labor, which details the final days of the Fraye Arbeter Shtime. In January 2019, The YIVO Institute for Jewish Research organized a special conference on Yiddish anarchism in New York City, which drew over 450 people.

Anarchists in contemporary Israel 

There are a number of anarchist groups in Israel. In the past decade, the Israeli group known as "Anarchists Against the Wall" became widely known in the ongoing struggle around the creation of the variously called Separation Wall/Fence/Barrier on the West Bank.

While most of them are Jewish, members of the group do not define themselves as being "Jewish anarchists".

Jewish anarchists

Jewish anarchist newspapers 

Anarhija
Anarhist
Anarkhist
Arbeter Fraynd
Buntar
Burevestnik
Chernoe Znamja (Black Flag)
Die Freie Gesellschaft
Dos Fraye Vort
Freie Arbeiter Stimme
Germinal
Kagenna Magazine
V Pomoštš' – Der Hilf-Ruf
Problemen

See also 

 Anarchism and religion
 Bavarian Soviet Republic
 Black Repartition
 Chernoe Znamia ("The Black Banner")
 Christian anarchism
 History of anarchism
 Jewish left
 New Jewish Agenda
 Revolutionary Insurrectionary Army of Ukraine

Notes

Further reading 
 

 Horrox, James. A Living Revolution: Anarchism in the Kibbutz Movement. Oakland: AK Press, 2009
 Zimmer, Kenyon. Immigrants Against the State: Yiddish and Italian Anarchism in America. Champaign: University of Illinois Press, 2015

External links 
Yiddish Anarchist Bibliography at the Kate Sharpley Library

 
Anarchist movements
Anarchist schools of thought
Anarchism